The 1954 Michigan State Spartans baseball team represented Michigan State University in the 1954 NCAA baseball season. The head coach was John Kobs, serving his 29th year. The Spartans finished the season in 3rd place in the 1954 College World Series.

Roster

Schedule 

! style="" | Regular Season
|- valign="top" 

|- align="center" bgcolor="#ffcccc"
| 1 || March 26 || at  || Jack Coombs Field • Durham, North Carolina || 3–6 || 0–1 || 0–0
|- align="center" bgcolor="#ccffcc"
| 2 || March 27 || at Duke || Jack Coombs Field • Durham, North Carolina || 8–2 || 1–1 || 0–0
|- align="center" bgcolor="#ffcccc"
| 3 || March 29 || at  || Emerson Field • Chapel Hill, North Carolina || 2–6 || 1–2 || 0–0
|- align="center" bgcolor="#ccffcc"
| 4 || March 30 || at  || Riddick Stadium • Raleigh, North Carolina || 5–3 || 2–2 || 0–0
|-

|- align="center" bgcolor="#ffcccc"
| 5 || April 2 || at Fort Eustis || Unknown • Newport News, Virginia || 4–12 || 2–3 || 0–0
|- align="center" bgcolor="#ffcccc"
| 6 || April 3 || at Fort Eustis || Unknown • Newport News, Virginia || 4–5 || 2–4 || 0–0
|- align="center" bgcolor="#ccffcc"
| 7 || April 3 || at Fort Eustis || Unknown • Newport News, Virginia || 4–0 || 3–4 || 0–0
|- align="center" bgcolor="#ccffcc"
| 8 || April 17 ||  || Old College Field • East Lansing, Michigan || 4–2 || 4–4 || 0–0
|- align="center" bgcolor="#ccffcc"
| 9 || April 21 ||  || Old College Field • East Lansing, Michigan || 9–3 || 5–4 || 0–0
|- align="center" bgcolor="#ccffcc"
| 10 || April 23 || at  || Rocky Miller Park • Evanston, Illinois || 4–0 || 6–4 || 1–0
|- align="center" bgcolor="#bbbbbb"
| 11 || April 24 || at  || Guy Lowman Field • Madison, Wisconsin || 3–3 || 6–4–1 || 1–0–1
|- align="center" bgcolor="#ccffcc"
| 12 || April 30 ||  || Old College Field • East Lansing, Michigan || 17–3 || 7–4–1 || 2–0–1
|-

|- align="center" bgcolor="#ccffcc"
| 13 || May 1 ||  || Old College Field • East Lansing, Michigan || 12–0 || 8–4–1 || 3–0–1
|- align="center" bgcolor="#ffcccc"
| 14 || May 1 || Purdue || Old College Field • East Lansing, Michigan || 2–5 || 8–5–1 || 3–1–1
|- align="center" bgcolor="#ccffcc"
| 15 || May 5 ||  || Old College Field • East Lansing, Michigan || 8–1 || 9–5–1 || 3–1–1
|- align="center" bgcolor="#ccffcc"
| 16 || May 7 || at  || Unknown • Iowa City, Iowa || 6–3 || 10–5–1 || 4–1–1
|- align="center" bgcolor="#ccffcc"
| 17 || May 8 || at  || Delta Field • Minneapolis, Minnesota || 8–5 || 11–5–1 || 5–1–1
|- align="center" bgcolor="#ccffcc"
| 18 || May 8 || at Minnesota || Delta Field • Minneapolis, Minnesota || 6–2 || 12–5–1 || 6–1–1
|- align="center" bgcolor="#ccffcc"
| 19 || May 14 ||  || Old College Field • East Lansing, Michigan || 6–4 || 13–5–1 || 7–1–1
|- align="center" bgcolor="#ccffcc"
| 20 || May 15 || at Michigan || Ray Fisher Stadium • Ann Arbor, Michigan || 8–4 || 14–5–1 || 8–1–1
|- align="center" bgcolor="#ffcccc"
| 21 || May 15 || at Michigan || Ray Fisher Stadium • Ann Arbor, Michigan || 8–9 || 14–6–1 || 8–2–1
|- align="center" bgcolor="#ccffcc"
| 22 || May 19 || at Wayne State || Unknown • Detroit, Michigan || 6–2 || 15–6–1 || 8–2–1
|- align="center" bgcolor="#ccffcc"
| 23 || May 21 ||  || Old College Field • East Lansing, Michigan || 5–2 || 16–6–1 || 9–2–1
|- align="center" bgcolor="#ccffcc"
| 24 || May 22 ||  || Old College Field • East Lansing, Michigan || 6–4 || 17–6–1 || 10–2–1
|- align="center" bgcolor="#ccffcc"
| 25 || May 22 || Ohio State || Old College Field • East Lansing, Michigan || 6–5 || 18–6–1 || 11–2–1
|- align="center" bgcolor="#ccffcc"
| 26 || May 26 || at Notre Dame || Unknown • Notre Dame, Indiana || 6–4 || 19–6–1 || 11–2–1
|- align="center" bgcolor="#ccffcc"
| 27 || May 29 || at Detroit || Unknown • Detroit, Michigan || 6–3 || 20–6–1 || 11–2–1
|-

|-
|-
! style="" | Postseason
|- valign="top"

|- align="center" bgcolor="#ccffcc"
| 28 || May 31 ||  || Old College Field • East Lansing, Michigan || 14–10 || 21–6–1 || 11–2–1
|- align="center" bgcolor="#ffcccc"
| 29 || May 31 || Ohio || Old College Field • East Lansing, Michigan || 0–7 || 21–7–1 || 11–2–1
|- align="center" bgcolor="#ccffcc"
| 30 || June 1 || Ohio || Old College Field • East Lansing, Michigan || 5–3 || 22–7–1 || 11–2–1
|-

|- align="center" bgcolor="#ffcccc"
| 31 || June 5 ||  || Old College Field • East Lansing, Michigan || 4–5 || 22–8–1 || 11–2–1
|-

|- align="center" bgcolor="#ccffcc"
| 32 || June 10 || vs  || Omaha Municipal Stadium • Omaha, Nebraska || 16–5 || 23–8–1 || 11–2–1
|- align="center" bgcolor="#ccffcc"
| 33 || June 11 || vs Arizona || Omaha Municipal Stadium • Omaha, Nebraska || 2–1 || 24–8–1 || 11–2–1
|- align="center" bgcolor="#ffcccc"
| 34 || June 12 || vs Rollins || Omaha Municipal Stadium • Omaha, Nebraska || 4–5 || 24–9–1 || 11–2–1
|- align="center" bgcolor="#ccffcc"
| 35 || June 13 || vs Rollins || Omaha Municipal Stadium • Omaha, Nebraska || 3–2 || 25–9–1 || 11–2–1
|- align="center" bgcolor="#ffcccc"
| 36 || June 14 || vs Missouri || Omaha Municipal Stadium • Omaha, Nebraska || 3–4 || 25–10–1 || 11–2–1
|-

References 

Michigan State Spartans baseball seasons
Michigan State Spartans baseball
College World Series seasons
Big Ten Conference baseball champion seasons
1954 Big Ten Conference baseball season